Râul Boului may refer to:

 Râul Boului, a tributary of the Bistrița in Gorj County
 Râul Boului, a tributary of the Toplița in Argeș County